Osama Ahmed Hezam Anbar (born 20 January 1995) is a Yemeni footballer who is last known to have played as a midfielder for Club Eagles.

Career

In 2020, Anbar signed for Maldivian side Club Eagles but left due to refusing to take the Indian Covaxin COVID-19 vaccine.

References

External links
 

1995 births
Al Yarmuk Al Rawda players
Association football midfielders
Club Eagles players
Dhivehi Premier League players
Expatriate footballers in the Maldives
Living people
Yemen international footballers
Yemeni expatriate footballers
Yemeni footballers
Yemeni League players